This is a list of episodes for Fast N' Loud Season 13. Season 13 started on October 16, 2017.

References 

2017 American television seasons